Benjamin Woltmann (born 7 June 1990) is a German footballer currently under contract for TSV Aindling.

See also
Football in Germany

References

External links

1990 births
Living people
German footballers
FC Augsburg players
2. Bundesliga players
Association football central defenders